Michal Petrouš (born 6 December 1969) is a Czech football manager and former player. He worked as a manager of Slavia Prague on two occasions and was in charge of Czech youth national teams. His younger brother Adam is also a former football player.

He participated in the 1989 FIFA World Youth Championship.

He was announced as the new manager of Slavia Prague in September 2010, following the resignation of Karel Jarolím. He continued in his role at Slavia until the ninth round of the 2011–12 Gambrinus liga when he lost his job, leaving the team in 13th position.

Petrouš returned as caretaker manager of Slavia in 2013 after manager Petr Rada left his position with five games of the 2012–13 season remaining.

He was appointed to the position of the Czech Under-18 national team in 2014 and later moved on to manage the Under-19 team.

References

External links
 Profile at idnes.cz 

1969 births
Living people
Czech footballers
Czechoslovak footballers
Czech football managers
Czech First League managers
Czech First League players
SK Slavia Prague players
FK Viktoria Žižkov players
Bohemians 1905 players
FC Viktoria Plzeň players
SK Slavia Prague managers
Association football defenders
SK Slavia Prague non-playing staff